The Ohio Athletic Conference (OAC) was formed in 1902 and is the third oldest athletic conference in the United States. Its current commissioner is Sarah Otey. Former commissioners include Mike Cleary, who was the first General Manager of a professional basketball team to hire an African American head coach, and would later run the National Association of Collegiate Directors of Athletics (NACDA). The Ohio Athletic Conference competes in the NCAA's Division III. Through the years, 31 schools have been members of the OAC. The enrollments of the current ten member institutions range from around 1,000 to 4,500. Member teams are located in Ohio.

History

The Ohio Athletic Conference was found in 1902 with six charter members—Case Tech, Kenyon, Oberlin, Ohio State, Ohio Wesleyan, and Western Reserve.  By 1934, the conference reached an all-time high of twenty-four members, seeing many schools come and go throughout the upcoming decades.  By 2000, the conference solidified to its current form with the addition of its final school, Wilmington, to ten members.

Conference timeline

 1902 - The Ohio Athletic Conference (OAC) was founded. Charter members included Case Institute of Technology, Kenyon College, Oberlin College, Ohio State University, Ohio Wesleyan University and Western Reserve University, effective beginning the 1902-03 academic year.
 1907 - Denison University, Heidelberg College (now Heidelberg University) and the College of Wooster joined the OAC, effective in the 1907-08 academic year.
 1909 - Wittenberg College (now Wittenberg University) joined the OAC, effective in the 1909-10 academic year.
 1910 - The University of Cincinnati and Ohio University joined the OAC, effective in the 1910-11 academic year.
 1911 - Miami University of Ohio joined the OAC, effective in the 1911-12 academic year.
 1912 - Ohio State left the OAC, effective after the 1911-12 academic year.
 1914 - Mount Union College (now the University of Mount Union) joined the OAC, effective in the 1914-15 academic year.
 1915 - The University of Akron and Baldwin Wallace College (now Baldwin Wallace University) joined the OAC, effective in the 1915-16 academic year.
 1916 - Ohio Northern University joined the OAC, effective in the 1916-17 academic year.
 1919 - Baldwin Wallace left the OAC, effective after the 1918-19 academic year.
 1920 - Hiram College joined the OAC, effective in the 1920-21 academic year.
 1921 - Otterbein College (now Otterbein University) and St. Xavier College (now Xavier University) joined the OAC, effective in the 1921-22 academic year.
 1922 - Muskingum College (now Muskingum University) joined the OAC, effective in the 1922-23 academic year.
 1923 - Baldwin Wallace re-joined back to the OAC for a second time, effective in the 1923-24 academic year.
 1924 - Cincinnati left the OAC, effective after the 1923-24 academic year.
 1926 - Marietta College joined the OAC, effective in the 1926-27 academic year.
 1927 - Capital University joined the OAC, effective in the 1927-28 academic year.
 1928 - Denison, Miami, Ohio, Ohio Wesleyan and Wittenberg left the OAC to form the Buckeye Conference alongside Cincinnati (who left 4 years prior), effective after the 1927-28 academic year.
 1931 - Ashland College (now Ashland University) joined the OAC, effective in the 1931-32 academic year.
 1932 - Western Reserve left the OAC, effective after the 1931-32 academic year.
 1932 - John Carroll University, Kent State College (now Kent State University) and Toledo University (now the University of Toledo) joined the OAC, effective in the 1932-33 academic year.
 1933 - Bowling Green State College (now Bowling Green State University) joined the OAC, with Denison re-joining for a second time as well, effective in the 1933-34 academic year.
 1934 - Wittenberg re-joined back to the OAC for a second time, effective in the 1934-35 academic year.
 1935 - Hiram left the OAC, effective after the 1934-35 academic year.
 1936 - Baldwin Wallace, Case Tech, John Carroll, Toledo and Xavier were suspended from the OAC for a violation of the opening date of football practice, all of them (except Xavier) were re-instated back the following school year.
 1936 - Akron and Xavier left the OAC, effective after the 1935-36 academic year.
 1942 - Bowling Green State left the OAC, effective after the 1941-42 academic year.
 1947 - Ohio Wesleyan re-joined back to the OAC for a second time, effective in the 1947-48 academic year.
 1944 - Akron re-joined back to the OAC for a second time, effective in the 1944-45 academic year (with football re-joining in the 1948 fall season (1948-49 academic year).
 1947 - Ohio Northern left the OAC, effective after the 1946-47 academic year.
 1947 - Ohio Wesleyan re-joined back to the OAC for a second time, effective in the 1947-48 academic year.
 1948 - Ashland and Case Tech, alongside Baldiwn Wallace for a second time, left the OAC, effective after the 1947-48 academic year.
 1949 - John Carroll and Toledo left the OAC, effective after the 1948-49 academic year.
 1951 - Kent State left the OAC, effective after the 1950-51 academic year.
 1951 - Hiram re-joined back to the OAC for a second time, effective in the 1951-52 academic year.
 1961 - Baldwin Wallace re-joined back to the OAC for a third time, effective in the 1946-47 academic year.
 1966 - Akron left the OAC for a second time, effective after the 1965-66 academic year.
 1971 - Hiram left the OAC for a second time, effective after the 1970-71 academic year.
 1973 - Ohio Northern re-joined back to the OAC for a second time, effective in the 1973-74 academic year.
 1984 - Kenyon, Oberlin and Wooster left the OAC, alongside Denison and Ohio Wesleyan for a second time, to form the North Coast Athletic Conference (NCAC), effective after the 1983-84 academic year.
 1989 - Wittenberg left the OAC for a second time, effective after the 1988-89 academic year.
 1989 - Hiram re-joined back to the OAC for a third time, alongside John Caroll who re-joined for a second time, effective in the 1989-90 academic year.
 1999 - Hiram left the OAC for a third time, effective after the 1998-99 academic year.
 2000 - Wilmington College of Ohio joined the OAC, effective in the 2000-01 academic year.
 2011 - Defiance College joined the OAC as an associate member for men's and women's swimming and diving, effective in the 2011-12 academic year.
 2012 - Transylvania University joined the OAC as an associate member for men's and women's swimming and diving, effective in the 2012-13 academic year.
 2015 - Manchester University joined the OAC as an associate member for men's and women's swimming and diving, effective in the 2015-16 academic year.

Member schools

Current members
The OAC currently has nine full members, all are private schools:

Notes

Former members
The OAC had 20 former full members, all but seven were private schools:

Notes

Former associate members
The OAC had three former associate members, all were private schools:

Membership timeline

Sports
In 2018–19, the OAC sponsors the following championships:

Facilities

OAC Tournament Championship History

Men's Swimming & Diving
 2016-19: John Carroll
 2006-16: Ohio Northern

Women's Swimming & Diving 
 2017-19: John Carroll
 2015-16: Mount Union

Men's Basketball
 2020-22: Marietta 
 2019-20: Mount Union
 2018-19: Baldwin Wallace
 2017-18: John Carroll
 2016-17: Marietta
 2015-16: John Carroll
 2014-15: Mount Union
 2013-14: Wilmington
 2012-13: Marietta
 2011-12: Capital
 2010-11: Marietta
 2009-10: Wilmington
 2008-09: John Carroll
 2007-08: Heidelberg
 2006-07: Capital

Women's Basketball
2022: Baldwin Wallace
 2020-21: John Carroll
 2019-20: Baldwin Wallace
 2018-19: John Carroll
 2017-18: Marietta
 2016-17: Ohio Northern
 2015-16: Mount Union
 2014-15: Baldwin Wallace
 2013-14: Capital
 2012-13: Ohio Northern
 2009-10, 2010–11, 2011-12: Mount Union
 2008-09: Capital
 2007-08: Baldwin Wallace
 2005-06, 2006-07: Wilmington
 2002-03, 2003-04: Wilmington

Football
 2017–19;2021: Mount Union
 2016: John Carroll
 1995–2015: Mount Union
 1994: Baldwin Wallace/John Carroll/Mount Union
 1992–1993: Mount Union
 1991: Baldwin Wallace
 1990: Mount Union
 1989: John Carroll
 1988: Baldwin Wallace/Wittenberg

Baseball
 2021-22: Marietta
 2019: Otterbein
 2018: Baldwin Wallace
 2017: Otterbein
 2015–16: Marietta
 2014: John Carroll
 2013: Mount Union
 2011–12: Marietta
 2010: Heidelberg

Men's Soccer
 2018-19: John Carroll
 2017: Otterbein
 2016: John Carroll
 2015: Ohio Northern
 2014: Heidelberg
 2010–13: Ohio Northern
 2009: Capital and Ohio Northern (tie)
 2008: Ohio Northern
 2004: Wilmington
 2000: Wilmington

Women's Soccer
 2019: Ohio Northern
 2018: Otterbein
 2017: Ohio Northern
 2016: Mount Union
 2013–15: Capital
 2012: Ohio Northern
 2011: Capital
 2010: Otterbein

Women's Volleyball
 2018–19: Ohio Northern
 2017: Otterbein
 2016: Ohio Northern
 2015: Heidelberg
 2011–14: Mount Union
 2010: Heidelberg
 2009: Ohio Northern
 2008: Heidelberg

Men's Golf
 2015–19: Otterbein
 2014: Baldwin Wallace
 2011: Mount Union
 2009–10: Otterbein
 2007–08: Mount Union
 1998–06: Otterbein
 1997: John Carroll
 1996: Otterbein
 1994–95: John Carroll
 1992–93: Otterbein
 1991: Heidelberg and Hiram (tie)
 1990: John Carroll
 1988–89: Wittenberg
 1987: Muskingum

Men's Wrestling
 2016–19: Baldwin Wallace
 2012–14: Heidelberg
 2011: Mount Union
 2006–10: Heidelberg
 2002–05: John Carroll
 2001: Ohio Northern
 2000: Muskingum

Men's Cross Country
 2018-2019: Otterbein
 2015–2017: Ohio Northern
 2012–2014: Mount Union
 2011: Ohio Northern
 2010: Mount Union
 2009: Heidelberg
 2007–2008: Ohio Northern
 2005–2006: Mount Union
 2003–2004: Otterbein
 2001–2002: Mount Union
 2000: Heidelberg

Women's Cross Country
 2015–18: Otterbein
 2014: Mount Union
 2013: John Carroll
 2010–12: Ohio Northern
 2009: Baldwin Wallace
 2008: Ohio Northern
 2007: Baldwin Wallace
 2006: Ohio Northern

Men's Lacrosse
 2016–19: John Carroll
 2013–15: Otterbein

Women's Lacrosse
 2014–19: Mount Union

References

External links